The Blencoe Falls is a segmented waterfall on the Blencoe Creek, located in Kirrama, Tablelands Region, in Far North Queensland, Australia.

Location and features

The falls can be reached by unsealed road from Mount Garnet on the Kennedy Highway. The unsealed Kirrama Range Road from Kennedy on the Bruce Highway also provides access from the coast to the falls. Access should only be attempted in dry conditions. Flooding can occur in the wetter months of December to April. Four-wheel-drive vehicles are recommended.

The traditional custodians of the land surrounding the Blencoe Falls are the Indigenous Australian Warrongo people, some of whom were driven over the ridges above Blencoe Falls to drown in the gorge.

The second season of Survivor was filmed in an area close to the falls.

See also

List of waterfalls of Queensland

References

External links

Waterfalls of Far North Queensland
Segmented waterfalls